Clara GAA is a GAA club based in Clara, County Offaly, Ireland. It participates in competitions organized by the Offaly GAA county board. The club fields both Gaelic football and Hurling teams.

History
The club was founded in 1884 and was the first club outside of Dublin to affiliate to the newly formed Gaelic Athletic Association. It is thus the oldest club in Offaly.

Achievements
 Offaly Senior Football Championship Winners (6) 1960, 1964, 1991, 1993, 2003, 2009  
 Runners-Up 1923, 1957, 1958, 1966, 1981, 1987, 1995, 2006, 2010, 2011, 2012, 2017
 Offaly Intermediate Football Championship Winners (1) 1956
 Offaly Intermediate Hurling Championship Winners (2) 1934, 2003
 Offaly Junior Football Championship Winners (6) 1911, 1919, 1928, 1954, 1999, 2007
 Offaly Junior A Hurling Championship Winners (6) 1920, 1926, 1941, 1983, 1996, 2015
 Leinster Special Junior Hurling Championship Winners (1) 2014

Notable players
 Brian Cowen

References

External links
 Offaly GAA Roll of Honour
 Clara GAA website

Gaelic games clubs in County Offaly
Gaelic football clubs in County Offaly
Hurling clubs in County Offaly